Food Science and Technology International is a bi-monthly peer-reviewed academic journal that publishes scholarly articles in the field of food science. The journal was established in 1995, and is currently published by SAGE Publications in association with the Spanish Council for Scientific Research (CSIC).

Scope
The journal publishes articles covering: food processing, nutritional quality, engineering composition, biotechnology, quality, safety, physical properties, microstructure, microbiology, sensory analysis, packaging, bioprocessing and postharvest technology.

Abstracting and indexing 
Food Science and Technology International is abstracted and indexed in Scopus, and the Science Citation Index Expanded. According to the Journal Citation Reports, its 2018 impact factor is 1.084.

References

External links
 

Food science journals
Bimonthly journals